The Georgia State League was an American Class D minor league in professional baseball that existed in 1906, 1914, 1920–1921 and 1948–1956. During its last incarnation, it existed alongside two nearby Class D circuits, the Georgia–Florida League and the Georgia–Alabama League.

The  version of the league began with six teams, but two clubs were forced to disband and a third to relocate before the league folded on July 9. Then, in  the Empire State League based in Georgia renamed itself Georgia State League. The six-team 1914 league played a full schedule and crowned a champion, the Americus Muckalees. But the resurgence of the league did not even last two years. The circuit started 1915 as the Georgia State League and was renamed the Florida–Alabama–Georgia League (the "FLAG League"), which operated in the state of Florida, on June 15.

After World War I, the league—again featuring half a dozen member clubs—was revived for two full campaigns. In 1920, it was dominated by legendary minor league slugger Ike Boone, who batted .403 and led the GSL in hits, runs and home runs.

The Georgia State League revived in  during the post-World War II boom in minor league baseball. But as the low minors began to experience falling attendance during the 1950s, the GSL began to suffer. Its Statesboro Pilots club disbanded on July 1, leaving the league with only five teams. The  Georgia State League began and finished the season with a full complement of six teams, but the league did not answer the bell for 1957.

Cities represented
Albany, GA: Albany 1906
Americus, GA: Americus Pallbearers 1906; Americus Muckalees 1914 
Baxley, GA: Baxley Red Sox 1948
Baxley, GA & Hazlehurst, GA: Baxley-Hazlehurst Red Socks 1949; Baxley-Hazlehurst Red Sox 1950; Hazlehurst-Baxley Red Sox 1951; Hazlehurst-Baxley Cardinals 1952-1955; Hazlehurst-Baxley Tigers 1956
Brunswick, GA: Brunswick 1906; Brunswick Pilots 1914
Carrollton, GA: Carrollton 1920–1921
Cedartown, GA: Cedartown Cedars 1920–1921
Columbus, GA: Columbus River Snipes 1906 
Cordele, GA: Cordele 1906; Cordele Ramblers 1914
Douglas, GA: Douglas Rebels 1948; Douglas Trojans 1949–1955; Douglas Reds 1956
Dublin, GA: Dublin Green Sox 1949–1952; Dublin Irish 1953–1956
Griffin, GA: Griffin 1920–1921
Eastman, GA: Eastman Dodgers 1948–1953
Fitzgerald, GA: Fitzgerald Pioneers 1948–1952
Jesup, GA: Jesup Bees 1950–1953
LaGrange, GA: LaGrange 1920–1921
Lindale, GA: Lindale Pepperells 1920–1921
Rome, GA: Rome 1920–1921
Sandersville, GA: Sandersville Wacos 1953–1954; Sandersville Giants 1955–1956
Sparta, GA: Sparta Saints 1948–1949 
Statesboro, GA: Statesboro Pilots 1952–1955 
Thomasville, GA: Thomasville Hornets 1914
Thomson, GA: Thomson Orioles 1956
Tifton, GA: Tifton Blue Sox 1949–1950
Valdosta, GA: Valdosta Stars 1906; Valdosta Millionaires 1914
Vidalia, GA: Vidalia Indians 1952–1956 
Vidalia, GA & Lyons, GA: Vidalia-Lyons Twins 1948–1950
Waycross, GA: Waycross Machinists 1906; Waycross Grasshoppers 1914

League champions

 1906 Waycross Machinists
 1914 Americus Muckalees
 1920 Carrollton
 1921 LaGrange
 1948 Fitzgerald Pioneers
 1949 Tifton Blue Sox
 1950 Eastman Dodgers
 1951 Dublin Green Sox
 1952 Vidalia Indians
 1953 Hazlehurst-Baxley Cardinals
 1954 Vidalia Indians
 1955 Douglas Trojans and Sandersville Giants
 1956 Douglas Reds

References
Johnson, Lloyd, and Wolff, Miles, editors: The Encyclopedia of Minor League Baseball. Durham, North Carolina: Baseball America, 1997.

Baseball leagues in Georgia (U.S. state)
Defunct minor baseball leagues in the United States
Sports leagues established in 1906
Sports leagues disestablished in 1956